Macrodiol may refer to:

 A diol that is a large molecule.
 Estradiol
 High-molecular weight diols used in the synthesis of polyurethanes